The Irish League in season 1951–52 comprised 12 teams, and Glenavon won the championship.

League standings

Results

References
Northern Ireland - List of final tables (RSSSF)

NIFL Premiership seasons
1951–52 in Northern Ireland association football
North